Dan Seymour may refer to:
Dan Seymour (1915–1993), American character actor.
Dan Seymour (announcer) (1914–1982), American radio and TV announcer who later became president and chief executive officer of the J. Walter Thompson advertising agency.